Fluoroacetyl chloride is an acyl chloride.

In 1948, William E. Truce of Purdue University described a synthesis of fluoroacetyl chloride which was undertaken "because of its potential value for introducing the group, —COCH2F, into organic molecules." In this synthesis, he reacted sodium fluoroacetate with phosphorus pentachloride to obtain the desired compound.

See also
Fluoroacetic acid
Methyl fluoroacetate

References

Acyl chlorides
Organofluorides
Fluoroacetyl compounds